Rekiya Yusuf is a Nigerian Nollywood actress. She was present at the launch of the African Movie Channel Original Productions (AMCOP), a production arm of the African Movie Channel (AMC) alongside other top Nollywood filmmakers.

Career
She played the role of "Valerie" in Sunkanmi Adebayo's 2015 drama film, Spotlight, also starring Segun Arinze, Desmond Elliott, Omoni Oboli , and others.

In 2017, Nigeria's Guardian Newspapers published that the Nigerian filmmaker, John Njama, was set to direct a television drama series entitled, My Flatmates, to feature Rekiya Yusuf, Bright Okpocha (Basket Mouth), Steve Onu (Yaw), Okey Bakassi, Buchi the comedian, Emmanuel Ikubese, Scarlet Sotade, and Wofai.

She was nominated for a Best Actress (TV Series) award at the second edition of the Ghana-Naija Showbiz Awards (GNSA), held in Lagos, Nigeria on October 14, 2018.

She was featured in Bright Okpocha's first feature 2019 horror film entitled, Exorcism of Alu, said to be screened across Nigerian cinemas from January 15. Other casts include Nigerian singer Sound Sultan and international casts such as Tevez Houston, Winona Crawford, Jamie Whitehouse, and others.

Filmography

Accolades

References

External links
 Rekiya Yusuf on IMDb

Living people
Year of birth missing (living people)
21st-century Nigerian actresses
Nigerian television actresses
Nigerian film actresses